St. Asaph Racetrack was a horse racing facility that operated until 1905 in the Del Ray neighborhood of Alexandria, Virginia. The track was built in the late 1800s under the name Gentlemen's Driving Club at St Asaph, and renamed St. Asaph Racetrack after a major renovation in 1894. The track was a flash point for powerful pro and anti gambling political interests. In May 1904, the track was raided by commonwealth attorney Crandal Mackey, who smashed the gambling equipment and arrested the owners. Anti-gambling forces finally prevailed and the track closed in 1905.

References

Defunct horse racing venues in the United States